Dhairyam may refer to:

 Dhairyam (2005 film), a 2005 Telugu film
 Dhairyam (2017 film), a 2017 Indian Kannada film